The Aloha Community Library is a library serving the community of Aloha, Oregon, United States. It is governed by the Aloha Community Library Association (ACLA), which is registered as a non-profit organization in the State of Oregon  and a 501(c)(3). The library opened September 22, 2012.

History
The library originated from an idea within a local quasi-governmental community group called Citizen Participation Organization 6 (CPO-6), which encompasses the unincorporated areas of Aloha, Reedville and Cooper Mountain, in Washington County.

Aloha community activist and political entrepreneur Eric Squires was primarily responsible for the initial planning for the library, forming a work group within CPO-6. Squires also serves as one of nine on the board of directors, with Doug Hoy as the president of that board. The library is a citizen-initiated effort in an unincorporated urban area of Washington County surrounded by the cities of Beaverton to the east, and Hillsboro to the west. Washington County Planning Commissioner Anthony R. Mills was also involved with planning for the creation of the library.

The library was opened in a  space within a strip mall on Farmington Road at Kinnaman Road anchored by Bales Thriftway. At the time of its opening, it had about 4,500 books, and a total collection of 6,000 items. The opening was attended by Congresswoman Suzanne Bonamici, County Commission Chair Andy Duyck, and Commissioner Dick Schouten. The Aloha Community Library also provides internet access, printing, DVDs, and a device assisting the vision impaired with optical magnification.

The library is currently a community library, as it is self-funded, but aspires to become part of Washington County Cooperative Library Services (WCCLS) in the 2015–2016 tax levy year, the first year the library might be eligible for admission to the WCCLS and the benefit of receiving financial support via a tax levy. The Aloha Community Library might transform into a public library at that point. Admission criteria for this transformation currently includes (as of 12-12-12) 40,000 annual item checkouts, 40 open hours per week, and certain paid staff in place. The library is currently open 37 hours per week, and admission to the WCCLS cooperative was recommended by the WCCLS Policy Group with the authority to determine efficacy of applicants.

In July 2013, the Washington County Commission approved $15,000 in county funds for preliminary design of a new library building.

In November 2015, Washington County voters approved a library levy that will bring the Aloha Library into the Washington County Cooperative Library Services in 2016. The library moved into a new larger location in January 2017.

References

2012 establishments in Oregon
Buildings and structures in Washington County, Oregon
Libraries established in 2012
Public libraries in Oregon